Jerónimo Bermúdez de Castro (1530–1599) was a playwright of the Spanish Golden Age.

Biography
He belonged to the order of St. Dominic, and was professor of theology at Salamanca.

Works
He published at Madrid in 1577, under the name of Antonio de Silva, two tragedies upon the subject of Inez de Castro, Nise Lastimosa and Nise Laureada. He also published a poem originally written in Latin, and translated by himself into Spanish, entitled La Hesperoida, of which the duke of Alva was the hero.

References

1530 births
1599 deaths
Spanish dramatists and playwrights
Spanish male dramatists and playwrights
Academic staff of the University of Salamanca
Dominican theologians